Hirzel Pass, elevation , is a mountain pass in the Alps between the cantons of Zürich and Zug in Switzerland. It connects Wädenswil and Sihlbrugg, and the summit is in the municipality of Hirzel.

Mountain passes of Switzerland
Mountain passes of the canton of Zürich
Mountain passes of the canton of Zug
Zug–Zürich border